State Route 174 (SR 174) is a  long north–south state highway in the northeastern quadrant of the U.S. state of Ohio.  The highway runs from its southern terminus at a T-intersection with Old Mill Road in a quiet residential neighborhood in the eastern Cleveland suburb of Gates Mills to its northern terminus at a signalized intersection with U.S. Route 20 (US 20) in Willoughby that doubles as the eastern terminus of SR 640.

Route description
The routing of SR 174 takes it through eastern Cuyahoga County and western Lake County.  No portion of SR 174 is included within the  National Highway System (NHS).  The NHS is a network of routes determined to be most important for the economy, mobility and defense of the country. SR 174's northern terminus and concurrency with US 20 has been unsigned since the early 1960s.

History
When SR 174 was established in 1923, it consisted of the following routing: Starting from its southern terminus at SR 91 in Solon, it followed what is now Solon Road northeasterly into Chagrin Falls.  It then ran northwest along what is now Chagrin Boulevard, formerly designated as US 422 and, before that, SR 16, to Chagrin River Road.  From there, SR 174 utilized Chagrin River Road heading north into Gates Mills, where it tied into its present-day southern terminus, and then followed the entirety of its current routing to its northern terminus in downtown Willoughby.

In 1929, SR 174 took on its present shape when all of the highway south of Gates Mills was removed from the state highway system.  Its new (and present) southern terminus was at US 322, which followed Old Mill Road at the time.  Even though US 322 was re-routed to the north within Gates Mills in 1940, SR 174 continues to end at Old Mill Road to this day.

Major intersections

References

External links

State Route 174 Endpoint Photos

174
Transportation in Cuyahoga County, Ohio
Transportation in Lake County, Ohio